Albertów  is a village in the administrative district of Gmina Lipie, within Kłobuck County, Silesian Voivodeship, in southern Poland.

The village has a population of 369.

During the German invasion of Poland, which started World War II, on September 3, 1939, the Germans carried out a massacre of 159 Poles in the village. The victims were inhabitants of Albertów and its surroundings (see Nazi crimes against the Polish nation).

References

Villages in Kłobuck County
Massacres of Poles
Nazi war crimes in Poland